Wat Chulamani ("Temple of the Crest Jewel") may refer to:

 Wat Chulamani, Ang Thong
 Wat Chulamani, Ayutthaya
 Wat Chulamani, Phitsanulok
 Wat Chulamani, Samut Songkhram